Leonardo García Alarcón (born 1976 in La Plata) is an Argentinian conductor specializing in baroque music.

He studied harpsichord and organ and was assistant to Gabriel Garrido for several years, before founding the ensemble Cappella Mediterranea, with whom he has performed at many festivals, particularly the Festival d'Ambronay. Following a performance of Il diluvio universale by Michelangelo Falvetti (1642–1692), he received the médaille de citoyen d'honneur d'Ambronay. He teaches at the Geneva Conservatoire and carries out research into 17th century basso continuo playing.

He shares direction of the Ensemble Clematis with violinist Stéphanie de Failly. Since 2010 he is artistic director of the Chœur de chambre de Namur, and La Nouvelle Ménestrandie.

Discography
 Mateo Romero - Romerico Florido Ensemble Clematis & Cappella Mediterranea, Leonardo García-Alarcón Ricercar - RIC308 2010
 Purcell - Dido and Aeneas La Nouvelle Ménestrandie & Cappella Mediterranea, Leonardo García Alarcón Ambronay - AMY022
 Barbara Strozzi - Virtuosissima Compositrice Madrigals 1644 Cappella Mediterranea, Leonarda García Alarcón - madrigals by Barbara Strozzi, Isabella Leonarda and Antonia Bembo. Ambronay - AMY020
 Frescobaldi - Il Regno d’Amore Ensemble Clematis, Leonardo García-Alarcón Ricercar - RIC300
 Handel - Judas Maccabaeus, HWV 63 recorded in the abbatial church of Ambronay, at the Ambronay Festival. Choeur de Chambre de Namur & Ensemble Les Agrémens, Leonardo García Alarcón Ambronay - AMY024
 Farina - Capriccio Stravagante & Sonate. Stéphanie de Failly (violin) Ensemble Clematis, Leonardo García-Alarcón Ricercar - RIC285
 Peter Philips, Motets & Madrigals. Cappella Mediterranea, Leonardo Garcia Alarcon Ambronay - AMY015
 Antonio de Salazar, Felipe Madre de Deus - Maestros Andaluces en Nueva Espana Cappella Mediterranea, Leonardo Garcia Alarcon. Almaviva 2004
 Carolus Hacquart - Cantiones & Sonate Ensemble Clematis, Céline Scheen, soprano, Stephan Van Dyck, tenor, Dirk Snellings, bass. Leonardo Garcia Alarcon and Stéphanie de Failly, direction
 J. S. Bach, secular cantatas BWV 201 and BWV 205
 Giovanni Giorgi (d. 1762) Ave Maria
 Giuseppe Zamponi Ulisse nell' Isola de Circé (Brussels 1650).

References

Living people
1976 births
Argentine conductors (music)
Male conductors (music)
People from La Plata
21st-century conductors (music)